Confetti Mario Pelino is one of the oldest Italian confectioneries founded in 1783 by Bernardino Pelino and located in Sulmona, Abruzzo, a region known for the production of Jordan almonds.

Since its founding it has been a family business, and as such it is a member of the Henokiens association.

See also 
Henokiens

References 

Article contains translated text from Confetti Mario Pelino on the French Wikipedia retrieved on 28 April 2017.

External links 
Homepage

Confectionery companies of Italy
Food and drink companies established in 1783
Henokiens companies
1783 establishments in Italy
Italian companies established in 1783